The 2022 Atlanta United 2 season is the team's fifth year of existence as well as their fifth and final season in the USL Championship, the second tier of the American soccer pyramid.

Players

As of October 22, 2022.
The squad of Atlanta United 2 will be composed of an unrestricted number of first-team players on loan to the reserve team, players signed to ATLUTD2, and Atlanta United Academy players. Academy players who appear in matches with ATLUTD2 will retain their college eligibility.

Player movement

In

Out

Competitions

USL Championship

League table

Results summary

Results by matchday

Matches

Statistics

Top Scorers

Appearances and goals

References

Atlanta United 2 seasons
Atlanta United 2
Atlanta
Atlanta United 2